Dato' Zulkefly Mohamad bin Omar is a Malaysian politician and currently serves as Speaker of the Negeri Sembilan State Legislative Assembly.

Election results

Honours 
  :
  Knight Commander of the Order of Loyalty to Negeri Sembilan (DPNS) - Dato' (2019)

References 

Living people
People from Negeri Sembilan
Malaysian people of Malay descent
National Trust Party (Malaysia) politicians
21st-century Malaysian politicians
Year of birth missing (living people)
Former Malaysian Islamic Party politicians